The Stephen F. Austin Lumberjacks baseball team is a varsity intercollegiate athletic team of Stephen F. Austin State University in Nacogdoches, Texas, United States. The team is a member of the Western Athletic Conference, which is part of the National Collegiate Athletic Association's Division I. The team plays its home games at Jaycees Field in Nacogdoches, Texas. The Lumberjacks are coached by Johnny Cardenas. On July 1, 2021, SFA left the Southland Conference to join the WAC.

History

Hunter Dozier became the first Lumberjack selected in the first round of the Major League Baseball (MLB) Draft, when the Royals selected him eighth overall in the 2013 MLB Draft.

See also
List of NCAA Division I baseball programs

References

External links